"Nightsong" is the second segment of the twenty-seventh episode, the third episode of the second season (1986–87) of the television series The Twilight Zone. In this segment, a radio disc jockey is confronted by a lover who mysteriously disappeared five years before.

Plot
Nighttime radio disc jockey Andie is in a funk after a short relationship with a fellow D.J. He leaves a record in her library: Nightsong by Simon Locke, a former lover, whom she has been pining for since he mysteriously disappeared five years earlier.

When she plays the album during her shift, Simon shows up. She confronts him angrily about his disappearance. She then turns and he's gone. When leaving the station after work, a motorcycle almost hits her but Simon saves her. He follows her and they begin rehashing their relationship.

At a coffee shop, Simon and Andie discuss their past and she questions why he hasn't produced music since they broke up. They discuss the good and bad times of their relationship, and she realizes that she doesn't want to get played by Simon so she leaves the cafe. At home, she finds "Nightsong" playing on her stereo. She then discovers Simon and asks him about his songs, which detailed their relationship. He attempts to seduce her but then stops and says that they can't have their relationship back.

Simon takes Andie toward the ocean on a back road, getting out near the edge of a cliff. He takes her down the hillside and tells her how after she played his album he decided to come back to explain to her what happened and help her move on with her life. He tells her he died in a motorcycle accident and was never discovered, pulling back some brush to reveal a wrecked motorcycle and his own rotted skeleton. Simon then fades away. Later, while she is at work she gets a call requesting "Nightsong". She tags the song with "from Andrea to Simon with love."

Production
The song "Nightsong" was written by Stephen Stills and Neil Young, and performed by Stills. The song, with additional overdubs, was included as the last track on the 1988 Crosby, Stills, Nash & Young album American Dream.

Lead actress Lisa Eilbacher was the girlfriend of director/cinematographer Bradford May at the time; the two were later married.

The radio station in the segment, KGRR, was named for the first three initials of George R. R. Martin, a frequent contributor to The Twilight Zone.

References

External links
 

The Twilight Zone (1985 TV series season 2) episodes
1986 American television episodes
Ghosts in popular culture

fr:La Chanson de la nuit